Wandearah West is a locality in the Australian state of South Australia located on the east coast of Spencer Gulf about  north-west of the Adelaide city centre and about  south of Port Pirie.

Its boundaries were created in June 1995 for the “long established name.”  The name was derived from the cadastral unit in which the locality is located - the Hundred of Wandearah, a hundred of the County of Victoria.

As of 2015, land within the locality was zoned for agriculture while a strip of land along its coastline was zoned for conservation.	The locator map in the infobox appears to go offshore as the base map shows the back of the beach and the locality boundary extends to low tide.

Wandearah West  is located within the federal division of Grey, the state electoral district of Frome and the local government area of the Port Pirie Regional Council.

References

Towns in South Australia
Spencer Gulf